Principia College (Principia or Prin) is a private liberal arts college in Elsah, Illinois. It was founded in 1912 by Mary Kimball Morgan with the purpose of "serving the Cause of Christian Science." "Although the College is not affiliated with the Christian Science Church, the practice of Christian Science is the cornerstone of campus life."

Principia sits on bluffs overlooking the Mississippi River between Alton and Grafton in the Metro East region of Southern Illinois, thirty miles north of St. Louis. A portion of the school's  campus is a designated National Historic Landmark District, for its many buildings and design by architect Bernard Maybeck.

History
Although Principia College was born out of The Principia, founded by Mary Kimball Morgan in 1898, the name Principia was not adopted until the year 1898. As Morgan's school grew, the founder of Christian Science, Mary Baker Eddy, approved The Principia's reference as a Christian Science school. Emerging from the Principia Lower, Middle, and Upper Schools founded between 1898 and 1906, Principia College was established with a purpose of "serving the Cause of Christian Science through appropriate channels open to it as an educational institution." The college, however, has no official affiliation with the Christian Science Church and Christian Science is not taught as a subject, but its principles form the basis of community life at Principia. The first Upper School class graduated in 1906 and it is from this class that a junior college was established, whose first alumni graduated in 1917. Principia College has been accredited by the Higher Learning Commission since 1923.

Following this time period, architect Bernard Maybeck was commissioned to design a new college campus in Elsah, Illinois and by 1931 ground was broken on what would become Maybeck's largest commission.

On the Principia College grounds is Eliestoun House, designed by Alexander Wadsworth Longfellow Jr. and completed in 1890. When Principia began moving to Elsah, guests stayed there, including Mary Kimball Morgan and Bernard Maybeck.

In 1934, Principia College graduated its first class as a full four-year institution and in 1935 the college was officially moved to its present-day location in Elsah. The year 1998 marked centennial celebrations by the school. The Principia College campus was once considered as the site for the United States Air Force Academy though ultimately the Air Force chose a location in Colorado Springs, Colorado, instead.

In the 21st century, the school's enrollment size has declined due to the dwindling number of Christian Scientists.

Campus

Housing and student life facilities

There are ten student dormitories on campus: Anderson Hall, Rackham Court, Howard House, Sylvester House, Buck House, Brooks House, Ferguson House, Joe McNabb, Lowrey House, and Clara McNabb. The first six mentioned were designed by former University of California, Berkeley professor and AIA Gold Medal winner Bernard Maybeck in 1935, as was the campus' chapel. Maybeck attempted to use different architectural styles and building techniques for each of these dormitories and for the chapel. In an effort to ensure success with his designs and materials, he experimented with them through the creation of a small building known affectionately by Principians as the "Mistake House." In celebration of the 2018 Illinois Bicentennial, the Principia College Campus was selected as one of the Illinois 200 Great Places  by the American Institute of Architects Illinois component (AIA Illinois).

Organization and administration 

Principia has an endowment of $696.2 million as of June 2020, giving it one of the highest endowments of any U.S. institution. The endowment size declined by more than $100 million in the decade prior to 2018.

Academics
Principia College offers twenty-seven majors in the liberal arts and sciences. The college does not currently offer a graduate program. The most popular majors include mass communication, biology, sociology, anthropology, studio and fine art, and business administration.

Principia offers various Study Abroad & Field Programs, International Student Programs, Conferences, and International Student Experiences.

In their 2019 rankings, U.S. News & World Report ranked Principia #83 (up from #139 in 2014) among all National Liberal Arts Colleges, and #5 in the category of "Best Value Schools". As of 2019, Principia College's annual tuition costs were $29,470, with additional costs of $11,610 for room and board (99% of freshmen lived on campus in 2018-19). In 2017, the school had an acceptance rate above 90%.

Student life
Principia College has a diverse student composition and amount of organizations given its size. 20% of its students are international and represent thirty countries on six of the world's seven continents. The college has forty student clubs and organizations, among these the Euphrates and Leadership institutes. The Public Affairs Conference at the college is one of oldest student-led conferences in America and has been held annually since 1939. The Principia College Speaker Series is a group of past, present, and future events that has featured United States President Barack Obama, American statesmen and retired four-star general Colin Powell, former United States president George H. W. Bush, former United States president Jimmy Carter, American author and poet Maya Angelou, David McCullough, Elie Wiesel, American actor and director Robert Duvall, Val Kilmer, Coretta Scott King, and Margaret Thatcher among others. In addition to the Public Affairs Conference Principia College holds an International Perspectives Conference with a focus on global issues such as human rights in Africa.

Technology
Of the technological programs present at Principia College, most prevalent and distinguished is its study in solar energy. The college has competed in solar car world events since 1995 and finished second in the North American Solar Challenge of 2008 and seventh in the World Solar Challenge of 2009.

Athletics
Principia College teams participate as a member of the National Collegiate Athletic Association's Division III in the St. Louis Intercollegiate Athletic Conference (SLIAC). The Principia Panther is the official mascot of Principia College and has been since its change from the Indian in 1984. There are sixteen varsity athletic teams at Principia College of which men's sports are baseball, basketball, cross country, soccer, swimming & diving, tennis, track & field, and rugby; and women's sports include basketball, cross country, beach volleyball, soccer, softball, swimming & diving, tennis, track & field and volleyball.

In 1983, the women's tennis team won the NCAA Division III national championship.

In 2013, the men's rugby team won the first ever Open Division USA Rugby 7s Collegiate National Championship, beating the University of Wisconsin-Stout 27-12 in the championship match.

In 2022, the men's rugby team completed an undefeated season by winning the Division II National Collegiate Rugby Championship XVs title, defeating Indiana University of Pennsylvania 47–16 in the championship match.

Notable alumni
Robert Bruegmann — architectural historian 
Chandler Burr — author 
Ian Ethan Case — guitarist
Ron Charles (B.A. 1984) — Washington Post book critic
Candy Crowley (attended) — CNN political correspondent 
Robert Duvall (B.A. 1953) — actor: Academy Award for Best Actor winner (1983, Tender Mercies)
Haru M. Reischauer — author of Samurai and Silk.
Emily Fridlund — author of History of Wolves
Ketti Frings — author, writer: Pulitzer Prize for Drama winner (1958, Look Homeward, Angel)
Lindsay Garritson — concert pianist and violinist
Jonathan Gibbs — Academy Award-winning digital animator
Aaron Goldsmith — MLB color commentator for the Seattle Mariners. Also commentator for Fox Sports 1 for college basketball.
Larry Groce — host of public radio's Mountain Stage
Peter Horton (attended) — actor and movie director
Mindy Jostyn (attended) — singer / songwriter
Donald L. Koch (B.A. 1968) — Chief Economist, Barnett Banks of Florida and Federal Reserve Bank of Atlanta
Egil Krogh — part of U.S. President Richard Nixon's administration who was convicted in the Watergate scandal.
Arend Lijphart — political scientist
David K. Lovegren — film producer
Miye Matsukata — jewelry designer
Terry Melcher — record producer and son of Doris Day
Ngozi Mwanamwambwa — first woman to compete for Zambia at an Olympics
Sara Nelson (B.A. 1995) — union leader
Brad Newsham (B.A. 1972) — writer
Vaughn Obern — filmmaker, department chairman, Cinema-Television, Los Angeles City College
John H. Rousselot (B.A. 1949) — United States Congressman from California (1961-1962, 1969-1982)
David Rowland — industrial designer who created the 40/4 stacking chair.
Christopher Shays (B.A. 1968) — United States Congressman from Connecticut (1987–2009)
Joanne Leedom-Ackerman (B.A. 1968) -- novelist

See also
Principia College Historic District
Principia Astronomical Observatory
The Principia

References

External links 

Official website
Official athletics website
Audio Recordings of the College's Radio Station in the 1970s
Illinois Great Places - Principia College Campus
Society of Architectural Historians SAH ARCHIPEDIA entry on Principia College Campus
Friends of Eliestoun

 
Christian Science in Illinois
The Principia
Educational institutions established in 1910
Liberal arts colleges in Illinois
Education in Jersey County, Illinois
Buildings and structures in Jersey County, Illinois
1910 establishments in Illinois
Private universities and colleges in Illinois